Power of Words is the second album by the Japanese singer and songwriter Rina Aiuchi. It was released on 15 May 2002 by Giza Studio. Six singles have been released from the dance music-influenced J-pop album, including four top 5 singles in Japan: "Navy Blue", "Forever You: Eien ni Kimi to", "I Can't Stop My Love for You" and "Can You Feel the Power of Words?". The album topped the Oricon albums chart in its first week and remained for 13 weeks on the chart, making it Aiuchi's best-selling album.

In support of the album, Aiuchi embarked on the concert tour entitled Rina Aiuchi Live Tour 2002 "Power of Words" from May 2002.

Track listing

Notes
 Track 2 is stylised as "I can't stop my love for you♥".

Use in ther media
"Faith" - theme song for Tokyo Broadcasting System Television program Wonderful
"Run Up" - ending theme for Tokyo Broadcasting System Television program Koko ga Hen dayo Nihonjin
"Navy Blue" - theme song for Tokyo Broadcasting System Television program Wonderful
"Forever You ~Eien ni Kimi to~" - theme song for Fuji TV program Kandou Factory - Sport!
"I can't stop my love for you♥" - opening theme for Anime television series Detective Conan
"Can you feel the Power of Words?" - insert song for Fuji TV variety program  The Letters ~Kazoku no Ai ni Arigatou~
"Spark" - theme song for Nihon TV program Yakyuu World Cup 2002

Cover version
The composer of "Forever You ~Eien ni Kimi to~", Aika Ohno covered this single in her cover album Silent Passage.

References 

2002 albums
Being Inc. albums
Giza Studio albums
Japanese-language albums
Albums produced by Daiko Nagato